"Speechless" is a duet between Jay Park and Cha Cha Malone, released on October 4, 2010 worldwide on Bandcamp, then on iTunes on October 11, 2010. It was also included in Park's single album released in South Korea "Bestie".

Background
The song was written and composed by fellow AOM crew member Cha Cha Malone, who also produced Jay Park's Bestie which was released at the same time.

Track listing

References

External links
 Official Website
  at SidusHQ 
 'Bestie' Single Album on Yedang Company Official Website
 

2010 singles
2010 songs
Rhythm and blues songs
Soul songs
Jay Park songs